Graveson Glacier is a broad north-flowing tributary to the Lillie Glacier, draining that portion of the Bowers Mountains between the Posey Range and the southern part of Explorers Range, Victoria Land, Antarctica. The geographical feature is fed by several lesser tributaries and enters Lillie Glacier via Flensing Icefall. The glacier was so named by the northern party of the New Zealand Geological Survey Antarctic Expedition, 1963–64, for F. Graveson, a mining engineer who wintered at Scott Base in 1963 and was field assistant on this expedition. The glacier lies situated on the Pennell Coast, a portion of Antarctica lying between Cape Williams and Cape Adare.

See also
 List of glaciers in the Antarctic
 Glaciology

References

Glaciers of Pennell Coast